Heterocrossa morbida is a moth of the Carposinidae family. It is endemic to New Zealand.

The wingspan is about 26 mm. The head, thorax and abdomen are ochreous-whitish, the shoulders with an ochreous spot. The forewings are elongate, rather narrow, posteriorly somewhat dilated, the costa gently arched, the apex obtuse, the termen straight and rather oblique. They are silvery-whitish-ochreous, irregularly strewn with ochreous scales. The hindwings and cilia are whitish. The under-surface of the forewings and hindwings is largely clothed with modified pale yellow-ochreous scales on the anterior half.

References

External links

 Male holotype specimen.

Carposinidae
Moths of New Zealand
Moths described in 1912
Taxa named by Edward Meyrick
Endemic fauna of New Zealand
Endemic moths of New Zealand